The 14th edition of the annual Holland Ladies Tour was held from September 6 to September 11, 2011. The women's stage race with an UCI rating of 2.2 started in Neerijnen, and finished in Berg en Terblijt.

Stages

2011-09-06: Neerijnen — Ophemert (114.3 km)

2011-09-07: Gemert — Gemert (20.5 km)

2011-09-08: Breda — Breda (115.2 km)

2011-09-09: Papendrecht — Papendrecht (127.5 km)

2011-09-10: Nuenen — Gerwen (113.7 km)

2011-09-11: Bunde — Berg en Terblijt (113.8 km)

Final standings

General Classification

References
CQ ranking

2011
Holland Ladies Tour
Holland Ladies Tour
Cycling in North Brabant
Cycling in Meerssen
Cycling in Nuenen, Gerwen en Nederwetten
Cycling in Papendrecht
Cycling in Valkenburg aan de Geul
Cycling in West Betuwe
Sports competitions in Breda
Sport in Gemert-Bakel